Jewish Futurism is used in three different contexts: religious, artistic and futures studies (foresight, futurology etc.)

Religious context 
Jewish Futurism is an attempt to apply futurism to theological and social issues facing Jewish persons and communities.

Jews who are futurists
 Alvin Toffler
 Fred Polak
 Herman Kahn
 Ray Kurzweil
 Dennis Gabor
 Faith Popcorn
 Robert Jungk
 Jeremy Rifkin
 Arthur Shostak

Israeli futurists
 Moshe Dror, president of the  World Network of Religious Futurists
 Tsvi Bisk, director of the Center for Strategic Futurist Thinking
 Yehezkel Dror, founder of the Jewish People Policy Planning Institute
 David Passig, head of the Virtual Reality Lab at Bar-Ilan University

A particular place on this list should be reserved for the practitioners of foresight. Foresight is a tool for developing visions, understood as possible future states of affairs that actions today can help bring about (or avoid). The practice of foresight is widespread in European strategic thinking, and to a much lesser level in Canada or United States. In Israel, foresight projects are developed at the Interdisciplinary Center for Technology Assessment and Forecasting from Tel Aviv University.

See also 
 Futures studies
 Jewish eschatology
 Tel Aviv University

References 

Futures studies
Jewish eschatology
Judaic studies
Secular Jewish culture